The 1983 World 600, the 24th running of the event, was a NASCAR Winston Cup Series racing event that took place on May 29, 1983, at the Charlotte Motor Speedway (Concord, North Carolina, US).

Background

The race was held at Charlotte Motor Speedway, a  quad-oval track located thirteen miles from Charlotte, North Carolina in Concord. The track sanctioned NASCAR Winston Cup Series events biannually during the 1983 season, with the other race being the Miller High Life 500. The track opened for the 1960 World 600, and was built by Bruton Smith and Curtis Turner.

Summary
This event took four hours, fifteen minutes, and fifty-one seconds to complete. Five cautions were waved for twenty-eight laps. Neil Bonnett defeated Richard Petty by a margin of 0.8 seconds in front of 137,000 people. Bonnett had previously won the 1982 running of the same event and would repeat his success. However, he would never win another World 600 race after this one. Canadian driver Trevor Boys started in 33rd and finished in 20th during this race in his #48 Chevrolet. Total winnings for this race were $407,190 ($ when adjusted for inflation).

Jimmy Means was in the top 10 in points after this race. He was ahead in the point standings of NASCAR legends such as Ricky Rudd, Dave Marcis, Tim Richmond, Geoff Bodine, Kyle Petty, and Dale Earnhardt. Bobby Allison and Bill Elliott had a great race going for the lead until they were both swept up in the Sterlin Marlin, Slick Johnson spin out. There was some heavy rainfall after the race which did not affect the race.

Margaret Claud Padgett was the designated Miss Winston for this race in addition to every NASCAR Winston Cup Series racing event held from 1981 to 1985.

Qualifying 

Drivers that failed to qualify were: Ronnie Thomas (#41), Lennie Pond, Jody Ridley (#84) and Rick Baldwin (#04).

Race results

Standings after the race

References

World 600
World 600
NASCAR races at Charlotte Motor Speedway